Urošević (Cyrillic script: Урошевић) is a Serbian surname derived from a masculine given name Uroš. It may refer to:

Božidar Urošević (born 1975), football goalkeeper
Novica Urošević (1945–2009), folk singer and composer
Slobodan Urošević (born 1994), football defender
Srđan Urošević (born 1984), football midfielder
Veljko Urošević (born 1978), rower
Alexandra Urošević (born 1989), artist 

Serbian surnames
Patronymic surnames
Surnames from given names